John Mandley (12 February 1909 – 18 December 1988) was an English footballer, he was noted for his pinpoint crosses. He spent eight years in the English Football League, playing for Port Vale from 1926 to 1930 and top flight Aston Villa from 1930 to 1934. He helped Vale to the Third Division North title in 1929–30, and helped Villa to finish second in the First Division in 1930–31 and 1932–33.

Career

Port Vale
Mandley played for Hanley Roman Catholic School, Cross Street Mission (North Staffs Sunday League football) and Boothen Vic. He joined Port Vale as an amateur in August 1926 and signed as a professional in May 1928. He scored his first senior goal on 13 October 1928, in a 3–2 win over Preston North End at The Old Recreation Ground, and also scored in a 2–1 home defeat to Potteries derby rivals Stoke City on 26 January 1929. He finished the 1928–29 season with five goals in 36 games. He suffered a spell on the sidelines between May and December 1929 due to injury, and after one goal in 15 games in 1929–30 he was sold to Aston Villa for a £7,000 fee in March 1930, despite great protests from the Vale supporters. Vale went on to finish the season as champions of the Third Division North.

Aston Villa
He spent just over four years at Villa Park, making 106 First Division and six cup appearances, scoring one cup goal and 25 league goals. The "Villans" finished fourth in 1929–30, with Mandley scoring once in eleven appearances. He scored eight times in 34 games in 1930–31, as Villa finished as runners-up, seven points behind champions Arsenal. He then scored six goals in 33 appearances as Villa second again in 1932–33, four points behind Arsenal. However, he was limited to two goals in six appearances as Villa finished 13th in 1933–34.

Altrincham
In August 1934, still only 25, he moved from one of the top clubs in the country, to Altrincham, who were then playing in the Cheshire County League. Also playing in the Cheshire league were the reserve outfit of his former team, Port Vale.

Career statistics
Source:

Honours
Port Vale
Football League Third Division North: 1929–30

References

1909 births
1988 deaths
Sportspeople from Hanley, Staffordshire
English Roman Catholics
English footballers
Association football midfielders
Port Vale F.C. players
Aston Villa F.C. players
Altrincham F.C. players
English Football League players